Matt Haryasz (born March 20, 1984) is a former American professional basketball player. Standing at 2.10 m (6 ft 11 in), Haryasz usually played as a center.

High school career
Born in Page, Arizona, Haryasz played high school basketball for Page High School, and averaged 25 points, 12 rebounds and 6 blocks for the team.

College career
Haryasz played four years for the Stanford Cardinal men's basketball team. In his last year, he led Cardinal in scoring (16.2 per game) and rebounding (8.2 per game).

Professional career
In 2006, Haryasz played two pre-season games for the Houston Rockets of the National Basketball Association (NBA). He was released on October 19, 2006. Afterwards he turned professional by signing in the NBA D-League with the Arkansas RimRockers.

In November 2009, Haryasz signed with GasTerra Flames in the Netherlands. Haryasz was one of the top tier players in the Dutch DBL and won the championship in his first season. In his second season, he won the NBB Cup with Flames.

References

1984 births
Living people
American expatriate basketball people in Belgium
American expatriate basketball people in Germany
American expatriate basketball people in Israel
American expatriate basketball people in Italy
American expatriate basketball people in the Netherlands
American men's basketball players
Arkansas RimRockers players
Basket Napoli players
Basketball players from Arizona
BC Oostende players
Bnei Hertzeliya basketball players
Centers (basketball)
Donar (basketball club) players
Dutch Basketball League players
Eisbären Bremerhaven players
People from Page, Arizona
Stanford Cardinal men's basketball players